Tilda Thamar (born Matilde Sofía Margarita Abrecht; 7 December 1921 – 12 April 1989) was an Argentine actress. She was born in Entre Rios Province, Argentina, in 1921. She was married to Spanish portrait painter Alejo Vidal-Quadras and divorced in 1971. Thamar and Vidal-Quadras lived in Paris, France. Thamar was killed in a car accident in  Clermont-en-Argonne, Meuse,  in the Lorraine region  of France in 1989.

Selected filmography
 Encadenado (1940)
 Wake Up to Life (1945)
 A Model from Paris (1946)
 White Horse Inn (1948)
 Night Round (1949)
 The Red Angel (1949)
 Oriental Port (1950)
 Devil's Roundup (1952)
 Massacre in Lace (1952)
 The Woman with the Orchid (1952)
 The Blonde Gypsy (1953)
 Monsieur Scrupule, Gangster (1953)
 Maid in Paris (1956)
 Paris, Palace Hotel (1956)
 The Babes in the Secret Service (1956)
 A Bomb for a Dictator (1957)
 A Night at the Moulin Rouge (1957)
 The Singer from Mexico (1957)
 Friends and Neighbours (1959)
 Living It Up (1966)
 Faceless (1987)

References

External links
 

1921 births
1989 deaths
Argentine film actresses
Burials at La Chacarita Cemetery
Road incident deaths in France
20th-century Argentine actresses
Argentine expatriates in France